Alina Müller (born 12 March 1998) is a Swiss ice hockey forward for the Northeastern Huskies and the Switzerland women's national ice hockey team. At the age of 15, she became the youngest ice hockey player ever to win an Olympic medal, scoring the game-winning goal for Switzerland in the bronze medal game at the 2014 Winter Olympics.

2014 Sochi Olympics
Müller represented Switzerland at the 2014 Winter Olympics and helped them win a bronze medal after scoring the game-winning goal to defeat Sweden in the bronze medal playoff. This resulted in her  becoming the youngest ice hockey player to ever win an Olympic medal, at the age of 15.

2018 PyeongChang Olympics
During the Swiss opening match against the United Korean team at the 2018 Winter Olympics, Müller tied the Olympic record for most goals scored by a woman in an Olympic game. She scored a hat trick in the first period, and a fourth goal in the second. Müller helped Switzerland place 5th overall at the 2018 Olympics.

Awards and honors
2018-19 CCM/AHCA First Team All-American
2019 Swiss Ice Hockey Woman of the Year
2019-20 CCM/AHCA Second Team All-American
2020-21 CCM/AHCA First Team All-American
2020-21 All-USCHO.com First Team
2021 Hockey East Scoring Champion (31 points)
2021 NCAA All-Tournament Team
Hockey Commissioners Association Women’s Player of the Month (February 2021) 
2022 Swiss Ice Hockey Woman of the Year

Personal life
Alina Müller is the younger sister of professional hockey player Mirco Müller, a former member of the New Jersey Devils of the National Hockey League.

References

External links

1998 births
Living people
Ice hockey players at the 2014 Winter Olympics
Ice hockey players at the 2018 Winter Olympics
Ice hockey players at the 2022 Winter Olympics
Medalists at the 2014 Winter Olympics
Olympic bronze medalists for Switzerland
Olympic ice hockey players of Switzerland
Olympic medalists in ice hockey
Swiss women's ice hockey forwards
Swiss expatriate ice hockey people
Swiss expatriate sportspeople in the United States
Northeastern Huskies women's ice hockey players